The 1994–95 Chicago Blackhawks season was the Hawks' 69th season. It was the Blackhawks' first season at United Center, which replaced Chicago Stadium as their home venue. The Hawks ended the regular season on a high note, winning their final five games. They tied the Detroit Red Wings for most power play goals (52) and had the best power play in the league (24.53%). They also allowed the fewest goals (115) and the fewest even-strength goals (76) during the regular season. It was an inconsistent season for the team, as they had three 5-game winning streaks (February 1 to 9; March 16 to 26; and April 25 to May 3) and one 13-game winless streak from March 29 to April 23. Within their winless streak, they lost 8 games in a row. Points-leader Bernie Nicholls had 3 hat tricks, including two four-goal games (the first one came on February 5 and the second one came on February 28). Nicholls' three-goal game came on March 21 in a 7-3 Blackhawks' win at San Jose.

Offseason

Regular season

Season standings

Schedule and results

Playoffs

In the Stanley Cup Playoffs, the Blackhawks defeated the Toronto Maple Leafs in a tight 7-game series, swept the Vancouver Canucks, and then lost to the Detroit Red Wings in the Western Conference Finals in 5 games; 3 of those games went into overtime (Detroit won all 3).

The Blackhawks were one of only 3 teams in 1994–95 to have a better regular-season record on the road than at home (the other 2 teams were the Florida Panthers and the Los Angeles Kings).

Player statistics

Forwards
Note: GP = Games played; G = Goals; A = Assists; Pts = Points; PIM = Penalty minutes

Defensemen
Note: GP = Games played; G = Goals; A = Assists; Pts = Points; PIM = Penalty minutes

Goaltending
Note: GP = Games played; W = Wins; L = Losses; T = Ties; SO = Shutouts; GAA = Goals against average

Draft picks

References
Blackhawks on Hockey Database
 

Chicago Blackhawks seasons
C
C
Chic
Chic